Class 97 may refer to:
British Rail Class 97
DRG Class 97, a class of German rack railway steam locomotive operated by the Deutsche Reichsbahn